Body-waves consist of P-waves that are the first to arrive (see seismogram), or S-waves, or reflections of either. Body-waves travel through rock directly.

mB scale 
However, it is not sensitive to events smaller than about M 5.5.

mb scale 
It was introduced in the 1960s with the establishment of the World-Wide Standardized Seismograph Network (WWSSN); the short period improves detection of smaller events, and better discriminates between tectonic earthquakes and underground nuclear explosions.

Measurement of  has changed several times. As originally defined by  mb was based on the maximum amplitude of waves in the first 10 seconds or more.  However, the length of the period influences the magnitude obtained.  Early USGS/NEIC practice was to measure  on the first second (just the first few P-waves), but since 1978 they measure the first twenty seconds. The modern practice is to measure short-period  scale at less than three seconds, while the broadband  scale is measured at periods of up to 30 seconds.

mbLg scale 

The ML scale was developed in southern California, which lies on blocks of oceanic crust, typically basalt or sedimentary rock, which have been accreted to the continent. East of the Rockies the continent is a craton, a thick and largely stable mass of continental crust that is largely granite, a harder rock with different seismic characteristics. In this area the ML scale gives anomalous results for earthquakes which by other measures seemed equivalent to quakes in California.

Nuttli resolved this by measuring the amplitude of short-period (~1 sec.) Lg waves, a complex form of the Love wave which, although a surface wave, he found provided a result more closely related to the  scale than the  scale. Lg waves attenuate quickly along any oceanic path, but propagate well through the granitic continental crust, and MbLg is often used in areas of stable continental crust; it is especially useful for detecting underground nuclear explosions.

Notes

Sources 
 
.

.

.

.

.

.

.

.

.

.

.

.

.

.

.

.

.

.

.

, NUREG/CR-1457.

. Also available here (sections renumbered).

.

.

.

.

.

.

, 310p.

.

.

.

.

.

.

.

.

.

.

.

.

.

.

.

.
 
Seismic magnitude scales